Dr. Identity (2007) is the fourth book and first novel by American author D. Harlan Wilson.  Set in a dystopian, mediatized future where people surrogate themselves with android lookalikes, the novel focuses on the foils of an English professor (Dr. 'Blah), his psychotic android (Dr. Identity), and their flight from the agents of the Law, especially the "Papanazi."  Like much of Wilson's work, Dr. Identity is distinguished by its ultraviolence, metanarration, and critique of media technology.  It is the first novel in the Scikungfi Trilogy along with the forthcoming Codename Prague (2009) and The Kyoto Man (2010).

External links 
 Review by James Maddox at Susurrus Magazine
 Review by Michael Gurnow at The Horror Review
 Review by Andersen Prunty at The Harrow
 Review by Matt Staggs at SkullRing.org
 Review by Mo Ali at Fractal Matter

2007 American novels
2007 science fiction novels
Novels by D. Harlan Wilson
Dystopian novels